Guanaceví is one of the 39 municipalities of Durango, in north-western Mexico. The municipal seat is at Guanaceví. The municipality covers an area of 5246.9 km².

In 2010, the municipality had a total population of 10,149, down from 10,224 in 2005.

In 2010, the town of Guanaceví had a population of 2,908. Other than the town of Guanaceví, the municipality had 348 localities, none of which had a population over 1,000.

References

Municipalities of Durango